The Roman Catholic Archdiocese of Changsha is an archdiocese located in the city of Changsha in China.

History
 April 2, 1856: Established as Apostolic Vicariate of Hunan from the Apostolic Vicariate of Hupeh
 September 19, 1879: Renamed as Apostolic Vicariate of Southern Hunan
 December 3, 1924: Renamed as Apostolic Vicariate of Changsha
 April 11, 1946: Promoted as Metropolitan Archdiocese of Changsha

Leadership
 Archbishops of Changsha 長沙 (Roman rite)
 Archbishop Methodius Qu Ailin (屈藹林) (2012–present)
 Archbishop Secondino Petronio Lacchio, O.F.M. (April 11, 1946 – February 20, 1976)
 Vicars Apostolic of Changsha 長沙 (Roman Rite) 
 Bishop Secondino Petronio Lacchio, O.F.M. (later Archbishop) (January 12, 1940 – April 11, 1946)
 Bishop Gaudenzio Giacinto Stanchi, O.F.M. (March 9, 1933 – 1939)
 Vicars Apostolic of Southern Hunan 湖南南境 (Roman Rite) 
 Bishop Noè Giuseppe Tacconi, P.I.M.E. (September 18, 1911 – 1916)
 Vicars Apostolic of Changsha 長沙 (Roman Rite) 
 Bishop Pellegrino Luigi Mondaini, O.F.M. (later Archbishop) (January 13, 1902 – August 11, 1930)
 Vicars Apostolic of Southern Hunan 湖南南境 (Roman Rite) 
 Saint Bishop Antonio Fantosati, O.F.M. (范懷德) (July 11, 1892 – July 7, 1900)

Suffragan dioceses
 Changde 常德
 Hengzhou 衡州
 Yuanling 沅陵

See also
 Cathedral of the Immaculate Conception (Changsha)

Sources
 GCatholic.org
 Catholic Hierarchy

Roman Catholic dioceses in China
Religious organizations established in 1856
Changsha
Roman Catholic dioceses and prelatures established in the 19th century
1856 establishments in China